Christ Church is an Episcopal church in Macon, Georgia. Founded in 1825, it was the first church established in the city. The current building was built in 1851 and added to the National Register of Historic Places in 1971.

History 

Christ Church was founded by Reverend Lot Jones on May 5, 1825 while on a mission through Georgia. Organized only three years after Macon was incorporated, it was the first church to be founded in the city. In 1826, the fourth convention for the Episcopal Diocese of Georgia was held at the Macon parish, with Bishop Nathaniel Bowen of the Episcopal Diocese of South Carolina presiding. The first building was constructed in 1834 and later consecrated in 1838. On February 24, 1844, Thomas Fielding Scott was ordained priest by Bishop Stephen Elliott in this building. In 1851, the church building was demolished and replaced by the current structure, a Gothic building which was consecrated by Elliott on May 2, 1852. In October 1863, the church donated its large church bell to the Macon Arsenal as part of the war effort. It would later be replaced in 1868. On December 19, 1867, noted poet Sidney Lanier was married in the church. On July 14, 1971, the church was added to the National Register of Historic Places.

See also 

 National Register of Historic Places listings in Bibb County, Georgia

References

Bibliography

External links 

Episcopal church buildings in Georgia (U.S. state)
Churches completed in 1834
Churches in Macon, Georgia
National Register of Historic Places in Bibb County, Georgia
Churches on the National Register of Historic Places in Georgia (U.S. state)